Abhanpur is a tehsil (administrative division) in Raipur district, Chhattisgarh, India. It is a part of the Naya Raipur township.

Geography
Abhanpur is located about 28 km southeast of Raipur. Abhanpur Tehsil (or administrative block) has 105 villages and 2 Nagar Panchayats.

Transport 
National Highway 43 passes through Abhanpur. The nearest airport is Raipur Airport and the nearest railway station is Raipur Junction. A mini-train runs from Abhanpur towards Rajim.

Economy
The primary activity is agriculture. The planned Naya Raipur market is expected to be located in Abhanpur.

Demographics 
Chhattisgarhi is the most spoken language.

Things to Do in Abhanpur 

 Nandan Van Zoo & Safari.
 Purkhouti Muktangan.
 Naya Raipur Central Park.
 Shri Rajiv Lochan Mandir.
 Urja Park.
 Woodkart Handicrafts Pvt. Ltd.

References

External links
 About Abhanpur

Cities and towns in Raipur district
Tehsils of Chhattisgarh